Lyrics is the fifth studio album by R&B singer Donell Jones. It released by Candyman Music, Jones's own label, through eOne Music on September 28, 2010 in the United States. The album marked his first release with the venture, following his departure from LaFace Records, and features production credits by Mike City and Jones himself. The album debuted at number 5 on the US Billboard Independent Albums chart and number 9 on Billboards Top R&B/Hip-Hop Albums chart with almost 15,000 in sales. "Love Like This" was the album's lead single.

Critical reception

Allmusic editor Andy Kellman rated the album three and a half ouf of five stars. He found that "the majority of it convincingly picks up where 2006's Journey of a Gemini left off. Jones has nothing to prove nor to lose, and that's the way this album sounds. He writes, plays, and produces most of the material and gets only a small amount of instrumental assistance. The probing "Imagine That" and "Blackmail," along with delicate-but-durable slow jams like "Love Like This" and "The Finer Things in Life," will be enough to please Jones' followers."

Track listing

Charts

References

External links
[ Lyrics] at Allmusic

Donell Jones albums
2010 albums